Olinda is a historic city in Pernambuco, Brazil.

Olinda may refer to:

Places 
Olinda, Victoria, Australia
Olinda, Ontario, Canada
Olinda, Brea, California, U.S.
Olinda, Hawaii, U.S.

People with the given name 
Olinda Beja (born 1946), São Tomé and Príncipe poet, writer and narrator
Olinda Bozán (1894–1977), Argentine film actress and comedian
Olinda Castielle (born 1976), Swedish television personality
Olinda Cho (born 1980), Singaporean singer, actress and entrepreneur
Olinda Morais (born 1951), East Timorese politician

See also

 Olindia, a genus of moths